The Rhodes 77 is an American sailboat that was designed by Philip Rhodes as a cruiser and first built in 1947.

The Rhodes 77 design, initially built from steel, was adapted for aluminum construction by McCurdy & Rhodes in the 1980s.

Production
The design was built by Burger Boat Company in Manitowoc, Wisconsin, United States, who built five boats starting in 1947, but it is now out of production.

A single boat was built in aluminum in place of steel in the 1980s after being redesigned for that material by McCurdy & Rhodes.

Design
The Rhodes 77 is a recreational keelboat, built predominantly of steel, including a  steel superstructure, with wood trim. It has a staysail ketch rig; a spooned, raked stem, a raised counter, angled transom, a rudder controlled by a wheel located in a wheelhouse and a fixed fin keel with a retractable centerboard. It displaces  and carries  of ballast.

It is fitted with an inboard engine for docking and maneuvering.

See also
List of sailing boat types

References

Keelboats
1940s sailboat type designs
Sailing yachts 
Sailboat type designs by McCurdy & Rhodes
Sailboat types built by Burger Boat Company